The Fuchs wheel, or 'Fuchs felge', is a specialty wheel made for the first Porsche 911 model in the early 1960s. They provided the rear-engined sports car with a reduction in unsprung mass, through a strong and lightweight alloy wheel.

History 
Although still in production, current appeal of the Fuchs wheel is derived from its vintage design and rich history in motor racing since the 1960s. Celebrating its 50th anniversary in 2017, the first vehicle to sport the Fuchs wheel design was the 1967 Porsche 911S, the first 'sports' model in the long history of 911 Porsches. While many manufacturers were using steel or even wire wheels at the time, Porsche Fuchs wheels were seen as revolutionary for their lightweight aluminium alloy construction.

While Porsche had some experience making lightweight aluminium for German tanks prior to 1960, they had difficulty transferring this technological expertise to their consumer automotive business. Porsche partnered with Otto Fuchs AG due to their experience with lightweight materials in the aerospace sector, and their willingness to apply their knowledge to automobiles.

With the first sketch created on 13 February 1965, and further intricacies discussed by the team using wooden models on 4 May, the final design was decided on by Heinrich Klie and Ferdinand Alexander Porsche at a conference in Stuttgart, Germany. In dimensions of 4.5 x 15 inches, the first Fuchs wheels were fitted on a 911 Targa to be presented at the 1965 IAA auto show to gauge response to the new design. On the basis of this, Porsche placed an order for 5,000 wheels from OTTO Fuchs for the coming year model 911S on 21 December 1965.

Similar to the Porsche design, Otto Fuchs created many wheels for other German manufacturers such as Mercedes-Benz, Audi and BMW which became very successful in their own rights. Most notably are the Mercedes 'baroque' style wheel which spanned a manufacturing period of 15 years until the late 1980s [3], and the multi-spoke design on the first BMW M5 (E28) in the same era. Otto Fuchs today proclaim that you are able to find Fuchs wheels on almost every model of the premium German manufactures at some point in time, including Lamborghini, Audi and Rolls-Royce in extension to Porsche, BMW and Mercedes.

Design 
As planning initially begun in 1965, Porsche requested a mass-produced wheel that was at least three kilograms lighter than the widely used steel wheels of the period, for their first iteration of the 911S. The rationale behind this was due to the significant effect that unsprung mass has on the handling and chassis dynamics of a car. Many wheel manufacturers contacted Porsche with cast aluminium wheels that fit the weight specification; however, during testing, all wheels produced using this process were found to be fragile and unable to handle the required load.

Otto Fuchs solved this problem for Porsche by using a method that was revolutionary for the time and never before used in a road automotive application, a one-piece forged aluminium wheel. This process involves pressing solid aluminium blocks under extreme pressure to produce high-strength parts, and is still used for the manufacture of Fuchs wheels today. Shortly following the release of the first design sketches on 13 February 1965, Otto Fuchs' forging process resulted in wheels that were 5 kg each, 3 kg lighter than the standard steel 911 wheels of the time.

Presented to Porsche in May 1965, the original shape of the Fuchs wheel featured tapered spokes in the five connecting webs between hub and rim. The transition from this presented proposal to the flat spokes of the synonymous 'cloverleaf' design was the working of Ferdinand Porsche Jr, and is summarised by an extract from the minutes of the meeting between the Fuchsfelge company and Porsche, which has been published by Porsche Newsroom, and states "In contrast to our proposal, Mr. Porsche Jr. changed the shape of the five connecting pieces between the hub and the rim for reasons of style and appearance. While our design was well-adapted to the shape of the series vehicles now being retired, the shape developed by Mr. Porsche Jr. appears more harmonious with the new vehicle". Ferdinand Porsche Jr based this design change off a 'kleeblatt', or four leaf clover.

Engineering 

Fuchsfelge AG was responsible for many technological advancements in the creation of automotive wheels around the late 1960s and early 1970s; notably the creation of the first forged wheel on behalf of Porsche, and the first series-production aluminium wheel, which was used on the 1972 Mercedes S-class.

In contrast to the production of a standard 'cast' wheel, forged wheels such as Fuchs endure a much more complex engineering and construction process to ensure maximum strength and minimum weight. Proprietary to Otto Fuchs AG, this process is completed in 6 steps. Under a force of 4,000 tonnes, a cast aluminium block is initially forged into a rotationally symmetric piece. Next, a general facia styling is applied to each disc through a forging force of 7,000 tonnes, and ventilation holes are stamped out to match the final design. Finally, the forged aluminium piece is fused with a lightweight barrel per desired width specifications, and the resulting wheel is subject to a lengthy process of turning, drilling, deburring and painting.

Today, each Fuchs wheel is made using a proprietary concoction of premium metals. Utilising an alloy base of 97% pure aluminium, the remaining 3% of the wrought alloy is added specifically for strength and weight saving properties. The majority of these come in the form of magnesium and silicon, with approximate contents by weight of 1.3% and 1% respectively. When added to pure alloy in conjunction with one another, magnesium and pure silicon increase strength greatly. Additionally, chromium, titanium and manganese are also added, ranging from 0.1% to 1% by weight of the resulting alloy, to further increase strength and improve recrystallisation resilience.

Early variations 
For the original Porsche 911S, there were three variations of the lightweight Fuchs wheel based on model year; a 15x4.5 inch size is the rarest from the 1967 model, slowly growing to 15x5.5 inches for 1968, and 15x6 inches for 1969. Coined the '6R', this 6-inch wide 'deep-dish' variant was originally produced for the front of the extremely limited 1967 Porsche 911R racecar. However, after August 1968, this variant evolved into two versions available as part of the 911S catalogue, and can be distinguished by being either 'without hearts' or 'with hearts' depending on the experience on the valve stem.

For the rear of the 911R, the '6R' rim was manufactured in a 7 inch variant denoted the '7R'; this can be distinguished from latter 7 inch Fuchs wheels by its 49 mm offset, vs the latter having a 23.3mm offset. This early 7R wheel was available on street-driven 911s until 1971, and is sought-after today due to the width and diameter combination allowing the use of many modern tyres.

Coinciding with the release of the 911 Carrera RS, a 15x8 inch variant was introduced alongside the continued manufacture of 6 and 7 inch widths. Available only on the 1973 model year of the Carrera RS, the 15x8 inch Fuchs wheel commands a large price premium in today's market as it is the only historically correct wheel for cars of this year, and was only produced for a 6-month period.

Potentially the most desirable era wheel for modern recreations of the 60's and 70's 911 models are the 15x9 inch and 15x11 inch Fuchs variants from the 1973–74 911RSR racecar. Although not street legal at the time, they are very popular today due to the availability of modern tyres.

Current production 

Today, over 2.5 million forged wheels are made at Otto Fuchs per annum for manufacturers such as Alfa Romeo, BMW, Ferrari, Rolls-Royce, Volkswagen, Mercedes-Benz and Porsche. There are currently over 400 tooling options available depending on size and surface finish.

Vintage specification Fuchs wheels are still currently produced in limited batches, and available through the Porsche Classic program to suit most 911 models from 1965 to the early 2000s. More recently, the 2010 Porsche Sport Classic of the 997 generation was sold with a 19-inch recreation of the iconic alloy wheel, however due to the limited run of only 250 vehicles, these wheels remain a hot commodity for owners looking to retrofit other modern 911s.

In addition to Porsche, Otto Fuchs continues to design and manufacture wheels for other German manufacturers, including Mercedes-Benz. For their flagship front-engined sports car the AMG GT, Fuchs designed forged wheels were available as an option in the 'exclusive' range from August 2014. One of the only Fuchs models to be available in either a brushed-aluminium or matte black finish, the multi-spoke design has the largest footprint of any road-going Fuchs wheels produced; 19 x 9 inches on the front, and 20 x 11 inches on the rear.

Vehicles featuring Fuchs Wheels as standard equipment

References 

Automobile wheels